Henry Wyatt may refer to:

 Sir Henry Wyatt (courtier) (1460–1537), English courtier
 Henry Wyatt (artist) (1794–1840), English portrait, subject and genre painter
 Henry H. Wyatt (1840–?), member of the Wisconsin State Assembly
 Henry Lawson Wyatt (1842–1861), first Confederate enlisted soldier to die in the American Civil War